Segelerite is a complex phosphate mineral with formula CaMgFe3+OH(PO4)2·H2O. It occurs in pegmatites and forms striking green or chartreuse crystals. It was discovered in 1974 in the Black Hills of South Dakota by an amateur mineralogist from New York, Curt G. Segeler (1901–1989), after whom it is named.

It is closely related to overite which is virtually the same mineral except that the iron is replaced by aluminium. Another mineral in the same series is juonniite wherein the iron is also replaced, this time by scandium.

References

Webmineral.com - Segelerite
Mindat.org - Segelerite
Handbook of Mineralogy - Segelerite

Calcium minerals
Magnesium minerals
Iron(III) minerals
Phosphate minerals
Orthorhombic minerals
Minerals in space group 61